The Hungarian Princess is a 1923 German silent film directed by Werner Funck and starring Margarete Schlegel, Adele Sandrock and Adolf Klein.

The film's sets were designed by the art director Carl Ludwig Kirmse.

Cast
 Margarete Schlegel
 Adele Sandrock
 Adolf Klein
 Eugen Rex
 Ferdinand Hart
 Leonhard Haskel
 Martin Herzberg
 Max Pohl
 Emil Rameau

References

Bibliography
 Gerhard Lamprecht. Deutsche Stummfilme, Volume 8.

External links

1923 films
Films of the Weimar Republic
German silent feature films
Films directed by Werner Funck
German black-and-white films
Circus films
1920s German films